Billy Stone (6 May 1901 – 14 December 1993) was a former Australian rules footballer who played with Carlton in the Victorian Football League (VFL).

Notes

External links 

Billy Stone's profile at Blueseum

1901 births
1993 deaths
Carlton Football Club players
Camberwell Football Club players
Australian rules footballers from Victoria (Australia)